Fitzpatrick Rock is a low ice-capped rock lying  northwest of Kilby Island at the mouth of Newcomb Bay, in the Windmill Islands, Antarctica. It was first charted in February 1957 by a party from the USS Glacier. The name was suggested by Lt. Robert C. Newcomb, USN, navigator of the Glacier, for Boatswain's Mate 2nd Class John Fitzpatrick, USN, member of the
survey party.

See also
 Composite Antarctic Gazetteer
 List of Antarctic and sub-Antarctic islands
 List of Antarctic islands south of 60° S
 SCAR
 Territorial claims in Antarctica

References

External links 

Windmill Islands